The 2014–15 Florida Panthers season was the 22nd season for the National Hockey League (NHL) franchise that was established on June 14, 1993.

Off-season
On April 29, 2014, General Manager Dale Tallon relieved Interim Head Coach Peter Horachek of his duties, and announced that the Panthers were looking to hire a new head coach with NHL experience prior to June 27, 2014, when the 2014 NHL Entry Draft will be held.

Training camp 
The Panthers will play in six pre-season exhibition games before the start of the 2014–15 regular season.

Memorable events 
On March 3, 2015, in a game against the Toronto Maple Leafs goaltender Roberto Luongo suffered an injury and was forced to leave the game; he was replaced by backup Al Montoya. Later in the same game, however, Montoya also suffered an injury. Without another available goaltender (NHL teams seldom have a third goaltender on the roster), Montoya attempted to continue playing with the injury while the team debated their options, reportedly considered between either having forward Derek MacKenzie play the position or calling on a "local" goaltender. Forty-one-year-old Goaltending Coach Rob Tallas subsequently dressed in goaltending gear, registered with the team's roster and began warming up in the dressing room tunnel in preparation to enter the game as an emergency backup, but before entering the game, however, Luongo was able to return and finish the remainder of the game. Allegedly, Luongo was at the hospital when Montoya was injured and was rushed back to the arena. This marked the second such instance for Tallas being called in as an emergency backup, with the other occurrence happening the previous season and also preventing him from officially entering the game as the original goaltender returned. Had he played, it would have been his first appearance in an NHL game in 14 years. The incident has reportedly lead the NHL to consider reviewing its rules for "emergency" players and led the Panthers to hold open tryouts for a "fill-in" goaltender.

Standings

Suspensions/fines

Schedule and results

Pre-season

Regular season

Playoffs 
Despite having 91 points, the Panthers failed to qualify for the playoffs for the third consecutive year.

Player stats 
Final stats
Skaters

Goaltenders

†Denotes player spent time with another team before joining the Panthers. Stats reflect time with the Panthers only.
‡Denotes player was traded mid-season. Stats reflect time with the Panthers only.
Bold/italics denotes franchise record.

Notable achievements

Awards

Milestones

Transactions 
The Panthers have been involved in the following transactions during the 2014–15 season:

Trades

Free agents acquired

Free agents lost

Claimed via waivers

Lost via waivers

Lost via retirement

Players released

Player signings

Draft picks

The 2014 NHL Entry Draft was held on June 27–28, 2014 at the Wells Fargo Center in Philadelphia, Pennsylvania. On April 15, 2014, the Panthers won the draft lottery to jump ahead of the Buffalo Sabres and secure the first selection in the draft.

Draft notes

 The Florida Panthers' third-round pick went to the Nashville Predators as the result of a trade on June 28, 2014 that sent a third and fourth-round pick (72nd and 102nd overall) both in 2014 to San Jose in exchange for this pick.    San Jose previously acquired this pick as the result of a trade on June 27, 2014 that sent a first-round pick and the Rangers sixth-round pick both in 2014 (20th and 179th overall) to Chicago in exchange for a first-round pick in 2014 (27th overall) and this pick.    Chicago previously acquired this pick as the result of a trade on March 2, 2014 that sent Brandon Pirri to Florida in exchange for a fifth-round pick in 2016 and this pick.
 The New York Islanders' third-round pick went to the Florida Panthers as the result of a trade on June 28, 2014 that sent a third-round pick in 2015 to New York in exchange for this pick.
 Florida's fifth-round pick went to the New York Rangers, as the result of a trade on July 20, 2012 that sent Casey Wellman to Florida, in exchange for this pick.
 The Pittsburgh Penguins' fifth-round pick went to the Florida Panthers as the result of a trade on March 5, 2014 that sent Marcel Goc to Pittsburgh in exchange for a third-round pick in 2015 and this pick.
Florida's sixth-round pick went to the New Jersey Devils, as the result of a trade on September 28, 2013 that sent Krys Barch and St. Louis' seventh-round pick in 2015 to Florida, in exchange for Scott Timmins and this pick.
 The Florida Panthers' seventh-round pick was re-acquired as the result of a trade on July 5, 2013 that sent George Parros to Montreal in exchange for Philippe Lefebvre and this pick.     Montreal previously acquired this pick as the result of a trade on June 30, 2013 that sent a seventh-round pick in 2013 to Florida in exchange for this pick.

References

Florida Panthers seasons
Florida
Florida Panthers season, 2014-15
Florida Panthers
Florida Panthers